Chile at the Olympic Games lays claim to being one of 14 nations to participate at the inaugural 1896 Summer Olympics and made its debut appearance at the 1948 Winter Olympics. the latter its eleventh edition. The national teams sent by Chile to each of the Olympic Games have been under the auspices of the Chilean Olympic Committee since its inception in 1934 and acceptance by the International Olympic Committee. Previous to the establishment of the Chilean Olympic Committee, athletes were sent to the Olympics under the auspices of the Chilean Athletics Federation.

The athletes representing Chile at the Olympics have brought home a total of thirteen medals, with tennis as the top medal-producing sport. Chile has yet to win any medals at the Winter Olympics.

Medal tables

Medals by Summer Games

Medals by Winter Games

Medals by sport

List of medalists 
A total of 30 athletes won 13 medals for Chile. Only three athletes won more than one medal: Óscar Cristi (two silver), Fernando Gonzalez (one gold, one silver and one bronze) and Nicolás Massú (two gold).

Olympic participants

498 athletes were members of the Chilean Olympic delegation.

Athletes by sports:

Summary by sport

Athletics

The Chilean Olympic Committee claims Luis Subercaseaux as its first Olympic athlete, in 1896; it is not clear whether he actually competed in any of the three events in which he was entered that year.

See also
 List of flag bearers for Chile at the Olympics
 :Category:Olympic competitors for Chile
Chile at the Paralympics

External links